The Addiko Bank is an Austrian banking group with numerous cross-border activities in the Alps-Adriatic region. The group is active in Slovenia, Croatia, Bosnia and Herzegovina, Serbia and Montenegro. However, the bank itself did not have a banking license in Austria, which now owned by Austrian Anadi Bank, another bank that was spun off Hypo Alpe-Adria-Bank International AG.

History 
Addiko Bank was the Balkan branches of Hypo Alpe-Adria-Bank International AG, which in 1990s explosively expanded into the Alps-to-Adriatic region.

 which thereafter was operating under the name of Hypo Alpe-Adria-Bank d.d., Mostar.  which has been operating under the name of Hypo Alpe-Adria-Bank a.d., Banja Luka 

In 2009 Hypo Alpe-Adria-Bank was nationalized. In 2014 Hypo Alpe-Adria-Bank was under resolution, which the Balkan branches was incorporated as Hypo Group Alpe Adria AG. In December 2014 it was sold to Advent International (80%) and the European Bank for Reconstruction and Development (20%).

The bank renamed itself as Addiko Bank on 7 July 2016, making the brand "Hypo Alpe-Adria-Bank" no longer exist as an active brand in any successors.

Business: banking and leasing 

The main line of business involves receiving "deposits" for citizens, businesses, public institutions, and local self-governance units, as well as retail, corporate, public and self-governance unit crediting, rendering services of domestic and international payment operations, issuing "letters of credit" and guarantees, services of Custody, "corporate finance",
depository bank services for "investment funds", brokerage services for local and international "capital markets", card business, e-banking services for legal and private persons, bank assurance services, leasing services and products for legal and private persons.

Hypo Alpe-Adria-Bank d.d. Mostar  
Type: joint stock company
Industry: Banking and Finance 
Seat: Kneza Branimira 2b, 88 000 Mostar, BiH
Chairman of the Management Board: Sanela Pašić

Hypo Alpe-Adria-Bank a.d. Banja Luka  
Type: joint stock company
Industry: Banking and Finance
Seat: Aleja Svetog Save, 78 000 Banja Luka, BiH
Chairman of the Management Board: Dragan Kovačević

See also
 List of banks in Serbia

References

Holding companies of Austria
Banks of Bosnia and Herzegovina
Banks of Croatia
Banks of Serbia
Banks of Slovenia
Banks of Montenegro
Banks established in 1896